Nagara, also known as Dionysopolis (Διονυσόπολις), was an ancient city in the northwest part of India intra Gangem (India within the Ganges), distinguished in Ptolemy by the title ἡ καὶ Διονυσόπολις 'also Dionysopolis'. It also appears in sources as Nagarahara, and was situated between the Kabul River and the Indus, in present-day Afghanistan. 

From the second name which Ptolemy has preserved, we are led to believe that this is the same place as Nysa (Νύσα) or Nyssa (Νύσσα), which was spared from plunder and destruction by Alexander the Great because the inhabitants asserted that it had been founded by Dionysus, when he conquered the area and he named the city Nysa and the land Nysaea (Νυσαία) after his nurse and also he named the mountain near the city, Meron (Μηρὸν) (i.e. thigh), because he grew in the thigh of Zeus.

When Alexander arrived at the city, together with his Companion cavalry went to the mountain and they made ivy garlands and crowned themselves with them, as they were, singing hymns in honor of Dionysus. Alexander also offered sacrifices to Dionysus, and feasted in company with his companions. On the other hand, according to Philostratus although Alexander wanted to go up the mountain he decided not to do it because he was afraid that when his men will see the vines which were on the mountain they would feel home sick or they will recover their taste for wine after they had become accustomed to water only, so he decided to make his vow and sacrifice to Dionysus at the foot of the mountain.

Archaeologist Zemaryalai Tarzi has suggested that, following the fall of the Greco-Bactrian cities of Ai-Khanoum and Takht-i Sangin, Greek populations were established in the plains of Jalalabad, which included Hadda, around the Hellenistic city of Dionysopolis, and that they were responsible for the Buddhist creations of Tapa Shotor in the 2nd century CE.

References

Ancient cities
Former populated places in Afghanistan
Archaeological sites in Afghanistan
Dionysus